The Cincinnati, Hamilton and Dayton Railway (CH&DR) was an electric interurban railway that existed between 1926 and 1930 in the U.S. state of Ohio. It was absorbed in 1930 into the new Cincinnati and Lake Erie interurban railway. In typical interurban fashion, in open country it had its own right of way, although this was often adjacent and parallel to a road. In cities and towns it operated on city streets. This included two and three car freight/express trains as well as passenger cars.

Creation of the Cincinnati Hamilton and Dayton

In 1926, the former Cincinnati and Dayton Traction Company was reorganised under the new name Cincinnati, Hamilton, and Dayton. The C&DTC right-of-way was part of the former Ohio Electric Railway's line between Dayton and Cincinnati. This new interurban company was headed by a former Univ of Penn Wharton School professor of finance, Dr. Thomas Conway, Jr., who had already been successful in reviving the interurban Chicago, Aurora, and Elgin Railroad. He ordered badly needed all steel interurban coaches, box-motor express cars and freight cars, and spent heavily to improve track and right-of-way, although the original 1900s rails laid within the brick streets of the cities and towns such as Dayton remained a maintenance problem and were a source of constant arguments with township administrations. Conway did well at building up the CH&D freight business utilising his new interurban freight equipment which often was operated at night, and by virtue of his wide contacts in the railroad industry was more than ordinarily successful in establishing through rates for LCL (less-than-boxcar load freight) with some steam railroads, not an easy thing to accomplish for an interurban. Conway believed that there was still a place for the interurban in medium distance passenger traffic and longer distance LCL freight, and thus conceived the idea of the CH&D.

Corporate concerns

Three problems worried CH&D management: that the CH&D's neighbouring interurban lines might stop running due to financial problems and break their vital freight interchange with the CH&D; that more and more towns were restricting the operation of freight trains over their streets to nighttime only; that interest payments on the very large CH&D bonded debt of $1.3 million borrowed in 1926 could not be met through operating revenue. 1926 was a time when many people earned between $1000 and $2000 a year, and a good dinner could be purchased for fifty cents.

Expansion makes the CH&D become the C&LE

In 1930, just as the Great Depression was starting but no one knew how bad it would be, Conway purchased and merged his profitable CH&D with two essential connecting interurbans Indiana, Columbus and Eastern, and the Lima-Toledo Railroad, to form the Cincinnati and Lake Erie Railroad. This new line now connected Cincinnati in southern Ohio with Toledo in northern Ohio. Conway then borrowed even more money ($3.7 million in bonds and new corporate stock) and ordered more new equipment, including the innovative light weight aluminium body high speed passenger car "Red Devils" from the Cincinnati Car Company.  With two other vitally important for C&LE survival interurban connections at Toledo, the new C&LE provided through interurban passenger and freight service east to Cleveland (Lake Shore Electric) and north to Detroit (Eastern Michigan Railway). The Red Devils operated directly from Cincinnati to Detroit for a while. Freight trains running from Cincinnati through Dayton and Toledo to Cleveland provided the longest continuous and same equipment interurban freight service to ever existing in the United States. Although each year the C&LE shipped more and more freight, the only year that it was profitable was 1936,  The accelerating collapse of the American economy through the late 1930s led to further C&LE financial losses and a steady decline in operations. The two essential Toledo connecting interurban lines closed due to bankruptcy, the Detroit connection earlier in 1932, and the more important for freight Cleveland connection in 1938, and the C&LE was doomed. It abandoned in 1939.

See also
List of defunct Ohio railroads
Cincinnati and Lake Erie Railroad
Lehigh Valley Transit Company
Cedar Rapids and Iowa City Railway

References

Bibliography 
 Streetcar, Interurban, and Railroad Information.  Retrieved on May 16, 2005.
 The Official Guide to the Railways, January 1930 Edition: Cincinnati, Hamilton & Dayton.
 Middleton, William. The Interurban Era, Kalmbach Publishing, Milwaukee, WI. 1969 (an excellent resource regarding 1910- 1950 interurbans in the United States and elsewhere. Over 400 pages, mostly photographs.)
 Middleton, Wm. The Time of the Trolley, Kalmbach Publishing, Milwaukee. 1964
 Rowsome, Frank Trolley Car Treasury
 Hilton, George The Interurban Electric Railway in America, Stanford University Press, Palo Alto, CA. 2000(a scholarly discussion (405 pages) of the financing, construction, rolling stock, and electrical systems of interurbans as a business. Every U.S. interurban is listed and discussed. No photographs.)
 Keenan, Jack "Cincinnati and Lake Erie Railroad," 226p, Golden West Books, 1974, Corona Del Mar, CA. 

Defunct Ohio railroads
Interurban railways in Ohio
History of Cincinnati
Passenger rail transportation in Cincinnati
Railway companies established in 1926
1930 disestablishments in Ohio
History of Dayton, Ohio
Transportation in Dayton, Ohio
1926 establishments in Ohio
American companies established in 1926